Geldungur is an island in the Vestmann Islands, south of Iceland. The island is one of the many islands that homes the Icelandic town Vestmannaeyjar (4,300 people). The island is only 5 acres

References

Vestmannaeyjar